The Wynne Commercial Historic District encompasses the historic early 20th century business district of Wynne, Arkansas.  It is bounded on the west by Front Street, on the north by East Commercial Street, on the south by East Pecan Street, and roughly on the east by South Wilson, East Union, and South Terry Streets.  This area was developed beginning with the arrival of the railroad in 1882, but a fire destroyed most of the center in 1887.  Consequently, most of the development in this area began in 1891 and was mostly built out by 1959.  The architecture in this area is largely early 20th-century brick commercial architecture, with some buildings exhibiting stylistic flourishes from the Italianate, Mediterranean, and Romanesque Revivals.

The district was listed on the National Register of Historic Places in 2009.

See also

National Register of Historic Places listings in Cross County, Arkansas

References

Historic districts on the National Register of Historic Places in Arkansas
Victorian architecture in Arkansas
Buildings and structures completed in 1891
Cross County, Arkansas
National Register of Historic Places in Cross County, Arkansas